Beatrice Cyiza is a Rwandan politician who currently serves as Director General of Environment and Climate Change at the Ministry of Environment in Rwanda.

Career 
Before joining the ministry of Environment, she worked at the Rwanda Institute for Conservation Agriculture as the Administrative Coordinator for Academic Affairs, Extension and Applied Research. Prior to that, she served as an Environmental Audit and Monitoring Officer at Rwanda Environment Management Authority (REMA).

Beatrice CYIZA is the Director General, Environment and Climate Change at the Ministry of Environment in Rwanda, overseeing the development and dissemination of legal instruments, strategies and programme related to environment protection, climate change and pollution control. Through various positions and trainings, she accumulated vast experience in environment management.

Before joining the Ministry of Environment, she worked at Rwanda Institute for Conservation Agriculture as the Administrative Coordinator for Academic Affairs, Extension and Applied Research.

Prior to that, She served as an Environmental Audit and Monitoring officer at Rwanda Environment Management Authority (REMA) and also served as the Nagoya Protocol Focal point for more than 7 years.

As a National focal point for the Nagoya Protocol, she managed different projects aiming at regulating the Access to the genetic resources by drafting different strategies and plans.

In her capacity as an Environmental Audit and Monitoring Officer; she conducted environmental audit activities for different projects under operation and monitored their compliance with environmental regulations.

References 

21st-century Rwandan women politicians
21st-century Rwandan politicians
Living people
Year of birth missing (living people)